Edwin Rees Beynon (17 November 1924 – February 2002) was a Welsh professional footballer who played as an inside forward. He made appearances in the English Football League for Wrexham and Shrewsbury Town.

References

1924 births
2002 deaths
Welsh footballers
Association football forwards
Wrexham A.F.C. players
Shrewsbury Town F.C. players
Telford United F.C. players
English Football League players